WWCS  (540 kHz) is a commercial AM radio station licensed to Canonsburg, Pennsylvania, and serving the Pittsburgh metropolitan area. The station is owned by Birach Broadcasting Corporation through its chairman and CEO, Sima Birach Jr.  WWCS airs a sports radio format. Most programming comes from the Houston-based sports network "SportsMap."

WWCS is powered at 5,000 watts by day.  But AM 540 is a Canadian and Mexican clear channel frequency.  So at night, WWCS must reduce its power to 500 watts to avoid interference.  It uses a directional antenna at all times.  The transmitter is off Angerer Road in Canonsburg.

History
On November 27, 1957, the station first signed on as WCNG.  At first, it was a daytimer station, required to go off the air at night.  Its power was only 250 watts.  The original owner was R.A. Douglass.

At various times in its history, the station has aired Spanish language Tropical music, children's radio, classical music, ethnic programming, oldies and Christian talk and teaching.

The station's call sign later switched to WARO.  It was known as "Radio One" during its days as WARO.  

Following ABC's LMA of WWCS from owner Birach Broadcasting, operations for the station moved from its transmitter building at 38 Angerer Road (Strang Lane) in Canonsburg to 400 Ardmore Boulevard in Wilkinsburg, the home of WEAE (ESPN Radio 1250) and WTAE-TV.  Under ABC, the station carried Radio Disney.

WWCS ceased to carry Radio Disney upon the expiration of ABC's lease of WWCS on December 31, 2010; the network's programming then moved to Disney-owned WEAE (renamed WDDZ), which disaffiliated from ESPN Radio.  From January to February 2011, the station aired a music loop directing listeners to WDDZ.

In February 2011, a Spanish language tropical music format began airing as a simulcast of WSDS from Detroit. The simulcast was replaced by Fox Sports Radio programming on January 1, 2012.  The Fox Sports network was previously cleared in Pittsburgh on WBGG, which dropped it when it replaced WEAE as the area's ESPN Radio affiliate.

It later switched to the Houston-based SB Nation Sports Network, which changed its name to SportsMap in 2020.

References

External links

540 simulcasting Spanish station

WCS
Washington County, Pennsylvania
Birach Broadcasting Corporation stations
Former subsidiaries of The Walt Disney Company